Aahuti is a 1985 Indian Kannada-language action drama film, directed by T. S. Nagabharana and produced by U. S. N. Babu. The film stars Ambareesh, Sumalatha and Roopadevi. The film's story and dialogues were written by Somu. The film's score and the soundtrack were scored by M. Ranga Rao and the cinematography was by Vijay.

It is reported that Ambareesh and Sumalatha became friends during the making of this film and eventually married in 1991 after 6 years.

Cast 
 Ambareesh
 Sumalatha
 Roopadevi
 Dheerendra Gopal
 Sundar Krishna Urs
 Balakrishna
 Mukhyamantri Chandru
 Musuri Krishnamurthy
 Shakti Prasad
 M. N. Lakshmi Devi
 Ashalatha
 Anuradha
 Sudheer
 Mysore Lokesh
 Sundaramma

Soundtrack 
The soundtrack of the film was composed by M. Ranga Rao.

References

External links 
 

1985 films
1980s Kannada-language films
Indian action drama films
Films scored by M. Ranga Rao
1980s action drama films
1985 drama films
Films directed by T. S. Nagabharana